"I'll Remember" is a song by Madonna.

I'll Remember may also refer to:

Music
I'll Remember, 1959 jazz album by Tony Scott (musician)

Songs
"I'll Remember", 1962 song by R. Dean Taylor, No. 23 in Canada
"I'll Remember", 1966 song by The Kinks from Face to Face
"I'll Remember", 1986 song by The Chameleons from Strange Times
"In the Still of the Nite (I'll Remember)", 1992 song by Boyz II Men

Television 
 "I'll Remember" (The Vampire Diaries), an episode of the television series The Vampire Diaries.

See also
"I Will Remember", 1995 song by Toto
"I Will Remember", 1987 song by Hard Rain